John Buller (1632–1716) was an English politician who sat in the House of Commons variously between 1656 and 1695. 

Buller inherited from his father the Cornish estate of Shillingham near Saltash, and owned an estate in the Isle of Thanet. He inherited from his first wife the Cornish estate of Morval, near Looe, in Cornwall. His ancestors had long been active in the county administration of Cornwall and he was himself ancestor to many eminent men, several members of parliament, the Buller baronets and Baron Churston and the famous soldier Major-General Sir Redvers Buller (1839–1908), VC.

Origins
The Bullers were a west country family who had become yeoman tenants following the dissolution of Glastonbury Abbey.  John Buller was the second son of Francis Buller, MP for Cornwall in 1640, of Shillingham near Saltash, in Cornwall and Ospringe in Kent by his wife Thomasine Honywood daughter of Sir Thomas Honywood. He was heir to his nephew James Buller (d.1707), who  was the only son of his elder brother Francis Buller (1630–1682), MP and who died without progeny. Francis had married Elizabeth Grosse, daughter and heiress of Ezekiel Grosse of Gowlden, who inherited 17 manors from her father.

Education
He entered the Middle Temple on 29 January 1646 and matriculated at Trinity College, Cambridge on 6 July 1647. Although he was called to the bar in 1652 it is not known whether he actually practised.

Career
Buller served as MP several times as follows:
1656 MP for the combined constituency of East Looe and West Looe in the Second Protectorate Parliament.  
1659 MP for East Looe and also for Saltash in the Third Protectorate Parliament, choosing to represent East Looe
1660 MP for West Looe in the Convention Parliament.
1661 MP for Saltash in the Cavalier Parliament.
1679, 1681 and 1689 MP for Liskeard.
1692 MP for Grampound and held the seat until 1695.

Sheriff of Cornwall
He was appointed High Sheriff of Cornwall from November 1688 to March 1689.

Marriages

Buller married twice:
Firstly in 1657 to Anne Coode, daughter and sole heiress of John Coode of Morval. He had issue by her John Buller (1668–1701), MP for Lostwithiel in 1701, of Morval, eldest son and heir, who married Mary Pollexfen, 3rd daughter and co-heiress of Sir Henry Pollexfen, Lord Chief Justice of the Common Pleas.  John died of smallpox and predeceased his father, but left a son John Francis Buller (1695–1751), of Morval, MP for Saltash 1718–1722, himself the father of three members of parliament: James Buller (1717–1765), John Buller (1721–1786), Lord of the Admiralty and Francis Buller (1723–1764).
Secondly to Jane Langdon, daughter of Walter Langdon of Keverall near East Looe.

References

1632 births
1716 deaths
Alumni of Trinity College, Cambridge
John
Members of the Middle Temple
English MPs 1656–1658
English MPs 1659
English MPs 1660
English MPs 1661–1679
English MPs 1679
English MPs 1681
English MPs 1689–1690
English MPs 1690–1695
John, died 1716
High Sheriffs of Cornwall
Members of the Parliament of England (pre-1707) for East Looe
Members of the Parliament of England for West Looe
Members of the Parliament of England for Saltash
Members of the Parliament of England (pre-1707) for Liskeard
Members of the Parliament of England for Grampound